The splenius muscles are:

Splenius capitis muscle
Splenius cervicis muscle

Their origins are in the upper thoracic and lower cervical spinous processes. Their actions are to extend and ipsilaterally rotate the head and neck.

References

Muscles of the torso